Shahid Ahmad Khattak is a Pakistani politician who had been a member of the National Assembly of Pakistan from August 2018 till January 2023.

Political career
He was elected to the National Assembly of Pakistan as a candidate of Pakistan Tehreek-e-Insaf (PTI) from Constituency NA-34 (Karak) in 2018 Pakistani general election. He received 77,181 votes and defeated Nawabzada Mohsin Ali Khan, a candidate of Pakistan Peoples Party (PPP).

References

External links
Profile Shahid Ahmad NA-34 Karak - MNA Profile

Living people
Pakistani MNAs 2018–2023
Year of birth missing (living people)